Richard Wayne Bey (born July 22, 1951) is an American talk show host. He was popular in the 1990s as host of The Richard Bey Show, a daytime talk show containing ordinary people's personal stories incorporated into entertaining competitive games.

Early years
Bey was born in Far Rockaway, Queens, New York, to a Jewish father and an Irish Catholic mother and attended Far Rockaway High School.

He is an alumnus of the University of California, Santa Barbara and the Yale School of Drama.

Prior to The Richard Bey Show, Bey hosted People Are Talking (telecast in New York City and Philadelphia) and 2 On the Town for WCBS-TV.  People Are Talking was a one-hour live broadcast covering topical news issues and one on one interviews with guests like Frank Zappa, Steven Spielberg, President Jimmy Carter, Sammy Davis Jr., Patricia Neal, Alexander Haig, Jerry Brown, Ross Perot and Martin and Charlie Sheen. The show was called 9 Broadcast Plaza in its early years before changing its name to The Richard Bey Show.  Among his roles on stage are Hamlet (title role) As You Like It, Twelfth Night, Troilus and Cressida as well as the world premieres of new plays by Richard Nelson, Chris Durang and Jim Lapine.  He was a company member of the Yale Repertory Theater and understudied the National Theatre of Great Britain on Broadway and at the Kennedy Center.  His film roles include Sacha Baron Cohen's Bruno, Evocateur, Meet Wally Sparks and George Washington (the mini series).

The Richard Bey Show

The Richard Bey Show (1992–1996) was produced from WWOR-TV in Secaucus, New Jersey and later syndicated across the country by All American Television (known today as FreemantleMedia). It featured such competitive events as the "Miss Big Butt" contest, the "Mr. Puniverse" contest, "Country Drag Queens versus City Drag Queens", "Dysfunctional Family Feud" and "Blacks who think O.J. is guilty vs. Whites who think he is innocent". Young women who were guests on the show were sometimes placed in a spoof of The Dating Game in which the guest interviewed three hidden "bachelors", all of whom were an obvious mismatch for the "bachelorette" (e.g., a drag queen or a dwarf). Bey's show made frequent use of sound effects like "uh-duh" for an insane response, "I've been framed" for a guest proclaiming innocence and "You're busted!" for one accused of wrongdoing.  Bey would often exclaim, "Where do they find these people?!" in the presence of unbelievable guests or audience members.  During some shows, there would be a secret word, and if an audience member used it in a comment, he would receive $100 (an homage to a prior talk and game show, You Bet Your Life). A joking suggestion was then made on how to spend it: "Lobster dinner tonight!"

The show was a precursor to reality television, featuring a variety of games incorporating guests' stories, most notoriously "The Wheel of Torture", in which a guest would be strapped to a spinning wheel while a spouse or lover poured slime on them as punishment for a misdeed. The show was executive produced by Bob Woodruff and David Sittenfeld.

Richard would frequently make fun of Jerry Springer on his show, as when he lost his contact lenses and was forced to wear eyeglasses, remarking, "Don't worry, you're not watching Jerry Springer" and showing Jerry in his "Bad Neighbors" segment, a reference to Springer's show being the lead-in or lead-out to Bey on many stations in the early-to-mid 1990s. He would also make light of Ricki Lake, Rosie O'Donnell, Phil Donahue, and Oprah Winfrey's shows. Bey also hosted a prime time show called "Night Games".  It was short-lived but ran around the time his daytime show was at its peak.  It ran after 10 o'clock and was a little more ribald with sexually clad women engaged in contests.

Bey claimed his TV show was canceled in December 1996 (despite the high ratings it maintained) as a direct result of doing a program with Gennifer Flowers, discussing her sexual relationship with then President Bill Clinton.

A scene from the film Brüno depicts the filming of an episode of a fictional variation on the show called Today with Richard Bey. The production team, along with Bey, set up the program to invite an unsuspecting audience to participate in a segment where Brüno (Sacha Baron Cohen) appears as a guest, talking about his adopted son who is black. In response to questions from the audience, Brüno reveals that he gave his son the "traditional African name" O.J. and claims that he "swapped" an iPod for his son. The predominantly black audience becomes outraged over Brüno's responses.

Radio years
After the TV show was canceled, Bey was an evening and later afternoon radio co-host along with Steve Malzberg on The Buzz, which aired on New York's WABC from 2000 to 2003.

According to the New York Post, he was one of only two talk hosts at the time on commercial New York radio to openly oppose the Iraq War, contesting the WMD evidence. He has since hosted on Sirius Satellite Radio, The Bill Press Show, and for the syndicated The Wall Street Journal: This Morning.

Bey hosted for a week on WXRK 92.3 FM from February 5 to February 9, 2007, from 10:00pm to midnight.  He regularly filled in for Lynn Samuels and Alex Bennett on the Sirius Satellite Radio channel Talk Left when they went on vacation or took a day off.

In August 2007, Bey began hosting a new show on WWRL in New York City from 8 to 10pm. In November 2007, he was teamed up with Mark Riley and moved to the morning drive, replacing the team of Sam Greenfield and Armstrong Williams.

In March 2008, family reasons caused Mark Riley to leave WWRL by mutual agreement to return to WLIB, and Richard was teamed up with longtime broadcaster Coz Carson. Bey later decided to leave WWRL himself, citing personal reasons (namely spending time with his son).

Until December 2009, he appeared daily on internet TV station UBA-TV from noon until 1:00pm.  Until 2019, he filled in on Sirius Left and hosted a blog on his now defunct website. In December 2013 he hosted the morning show in the final weeks of WWRL before it switched to Spanish language broadcasting.

Personal life 
As of 2009, Bey had never been married and was helping to raise the ten-year-old son of a former girlfriend,  and lives in midtown Manhattan in New York City.

References

External links 
Richard Bey's website

Richard' Bey's Facebook Message App

1951 births
Living people
American talk radio hosts
American television talk show hosts
Far Rockaway High School alumni
People from Far Rockaway, Queens
Yale School of Drama alumni